A sheet cake or slab cake is a cake baked in a large, flat, rectangular cake pan. Sheet cakes can be grouped into two broad categories.

American sheet cake 
These single-layer cakes are frequently frosted, with decorations and ornamental frosting along the borders and the flat top surface. 

They may be made in any flavor, with chocolate and vanilla being the two most common. Commonly made in the home with boxed cake mixes, they can come in a variety of additional flavors, with batter mix-ins such as sprinkles and chocolate chips. By definition, they are made from a single continuous piece of cake. Ingredients such as nuts, chocolate chips, or coconut may be sprinkled over the top.

A layer cake may be made from a sheet cake that has been split, filled with jam or icing, and frosted.

Purchasing 
In the United States, these cakes are commonly available in supermarkets and bakeries and tend to be inexpensive due to their simple manufacturing process.

Size 
Cake sizes are named after the size of pan that the cake is baked in. A half-sheet is half that size, and a quarter-sheet or  pan, which usually results in 16 to 24 servings of cake, is one-quarter the size.

Gallery

German sheet cake 
Several kinds of sheet cake are also part of traditional German cuisine. They are typically not iced or decorated for a specific celebration as American sheet cakes are, and may use any kind of dough such as yeast-leavened or sponge.

Gallery

See also 

 Cake decorating
 Swiss roll
 List of desserts

References

American cakes
British cakes
German cakes
Canadian desserts
Australian desserts